Encryphodes ethiopella is a species of snout moth. It was described by Boris Balinsky in 1991 and is found in South Africa.

References

Endemic moths of South Africa
Phycitini
Moths described in 1913